In mathematics, an asymmetric norm on a vector space is a generalization of the concept of a norm.

Definition

An asymmetric norm on a real vector space  is a function  that has the following properties:

 Subadditivity, or the triangle inequality: 
 Nonnegative homogeneity:  and every non-negative real number 
 Positive definiteness: 

Asymmetric norms differ from norms in that they need not satisfy the equality  

If the condition of positive definiteness is omitted, then  is an asymmetric seminorm.

Examples 

On the real line  the function  given by

is an asymmetric norm but not a norm.

 for 
This functional is an asymmetric seminorm if  is an absorbing set, which means that  and ensures that  is finite for each

Corresponce between asymmetric seminorms and convex subsets of the dual space 

For instance, if  is the square with vertices  then  is the taxicab norm  Different convex sets yield different seminorms, and every asymmetric seminorm on  can be obtained from some convex set, called its dual unit ball. Therefore, asymmetric seminorms are in one-to-one correspondence with convex sets that contain the origin. The seminorm  is 
 positive definite if and only if  contains the origin in its topological interior,
 symmetric if and only if 

See also

References

 
 S. Cobzas, Functional Analysis in Asymmetric Normed Spaces, Frontiers in Mathematics, Basel: Birkhäuser, 2013; .  

Linear algebra
Norms (mathematics)